This is a list of newspaper titles published in, or for the Mid West region of Western Australia.

The Mid West region covers 472,336 square kilometres and accounts for 8.7% of the Western Australian population. There is  some crossover between Mid West newspapers and the newspapers of the Pilbara and Gascoyne regions.

Titles

See also 
 List of newspapers in Western Australia
 Gascoyne newspapers
 Goldfields-Esperance newspapers
 Great Southern newspapers
 Kimberley newspapers
 Pilbara newspapers
 South West newspapers
 Wheatbelt newspapers

References

External links 
 
 
 
 
 
 
 
 

Lists of newspapers published in Western Australia

Newspapers of the Mid West region of Western Australia